Margaret Mary Marlowe (18 February 1884 – 19 February 1962) was an Australian actress, writer and journalist.

Early life and education 
Marlowe was born at the Beaconsfield Hotel, St Kilda, Victoria on 18 February 1884. She was the only child of grazier John and Margaret Shanahan, daughter of John O'Shanassy, second premier of Victoria. She was educated at home by a governess who encouraged her love of reading and writing and also attended a convent in Windsor and studied singing and dancing.

Career 
Marlowe first known stage appearance was in March 1906 in The Sign of the Cross. She toured with the Julius Knight Company from 1907. She went to London in 1910 where she performed with Stanley Cook's company, playing Sally Grace in The Man From Mexico. In 1912 she played Kate Rudd in the first performances of On Our Selection.

In 1920 Marlowe returned to Australia where she was employed by the Sydney Sun, writing theatre reviews under the pseudonym "Puck".

Death and legacy 
Marlowe died on 19 February 1962 at Rooty Hill, New South Wales. She was buried at Mona Vale cemetery.

Her autobiography, That Fragile Hour, was published posthumously by Angus and Robertson in 1990. Her papers are held in the State Library of New South Wales.

Selected works 

 Kangaroos in King's Land: The Adventures of Four Australian Girls in England, 1917
 The Women Who Wait, 1918
 The Ghost Girl, 1921
 Gypsy Royal, Adventuress, 1923
 A Child by Proxy, 1925 (serialised in the Australian Woman's Mirror)
 An Unofficial Rose, 1927
 Said the Spider: A Romance of Papua and New York, 1929
 Island Calm, 1933 (serialised in the Australian Woman's Mirror)
 Psalmist of the Dawn, 1934

References 

1884 births
1962 deaths
20th-century Australian actresses
20th-century Australian women writers
20th-century Australian journalists
People from St Kilda, Victoria
Actresses from Melbourne
Writers from Melbourne